Ho Ven On  is a former civil servant in Macau and served as Assistant Secretary for Administration, Education and Youth during Portuguese rule of Macau.

He was one a few local Chinese in the senior ranks of the civil service in Macau.

See also
 Politics of Macau

References

Living people
Government ministers of Macau
Year of birth missing (living people)